Arthur C. Clarke's World of Strange Powers is a thirteen-part British television series looking at strange worlds of the paranormal. It was produced by Yorkshire Television for the ITV network and first broadcast in 1985. It was the sequel to the 1980 series Arthur C. Clarke's Mysterious World.

The series is introduced by science fiction writer Arthur C. Clarke in short sequences filmed at his home in Sri Lanka. Individual episodes are narrated by Anna Ford. The series was produced by John Fairley and directed by Peter Jones, Michael Weigall and Charles Flynn.

In 1984, G.P. Putnam's Sons published a hardcover book with the same name, authored by Simon Welfare and John Fairley, where the contents of the show were further explored. It featured an introduction written by Clarke as well as his remarks at the end of each chapter or topic. In 1985, a paperback of this book was released by HarperCollins Publishers.

The series was followed by Arthur C. Clarke's Mysterious Universe, broadcast in 1994.

Episodes

Home release
A collection DVD Box Set of all three Arthur C. Clarke documentary series, Arthur C. Clarke's Mysterious World, Arthur C. Clarke's World of Strange Powers and Arthur C. Clarke's Mysterious Universe was released in July 2013 by Visual Entertainment, which also re-released them separately in September 2013.

External links

References

1985 British television series debuts
1985 British television series endings
Television series by Arthur C. Clarke
ITV documentaries
Paranormal television
British supernatural television shows
Television series by ITV Studios
English-language television shows
Television series by Yorkshire Television
Discovery Channel original programming